The Heidelberg University School of Medicine (also known as the Medical Faculty of Heidelberg) is one of twelve schools at the Heidelberg University. It was one of the four original faculties of the university in 1386. It comprises today 22 institutes and maintains a close relationship to the University Hospital Heidelberg.

Its medical degree program comprising two years of basic science, followed by the first of the two steps of the German medical licensing examination, and four years of clinical studies, has undergone a fundamental reform in 2001: From 2001 on, all medical students at Heidelberg University, University Hospital Heidelberg (as opposed to the Heidelberg University Faculty of Medicine in Mannheim) pursue a reformed six-year-long course named "HeiCuMed" ("Heidelberger Curriculum Medicinale"). This degree course is an adapted version of the Harvard Medical School curriculum. Undergraduate, graduate and postgraduate programs of Heidelberg University Medical School have played a fundamental role in Heidelberg being awarded  "University of Excellence" status by the German Universities Excellence Initiative.

Noted physicians 
Markus Büchler
Vincenz Czerny
Thomas Erastus
Wilhelm Heinrich Erb
Werner Hacke
Harald zur Hausen
Hermann von Helmholtz
Ludolf von Krehl
Albrecht Kossel
Otto Meyerhof
Bert Sakmann

Rankings 

The Heidelberg University School of Medicine has been consistently ranked as one of top medical schools in Germany. 

In the national 2020 CHE University Ranking, the department is rated in the top group in 23 out of 25 criteria.

Notes and references 

Heidelberg University
1380s establishments in the Holy Roman Empire
1386 establishments in Europe
Medical schools in Germany